Randhir Singh (2 January 1922 – 31 January 2016) was a Marxist scholar, political theorist and teacher from India. His native village was Manuke in present-day Moga district of Punjab, India. However, he was brought up in Lahore where his father was working as a doctor. He is known as one of the founders of the student movement in the country in the 1930s and a freedom fighter who remained in jail during India's freedom movement in the 1940s. Most of the period he taught at Delhi University. Although he was a teacher of political science, students from other subjects also used to attend his class and listen to Singh, even standing outside classroom premises or around windows as his classroom was always full.  He retired as Professor from Delhi University in 1987. His death has got attention of some of the world leaders like Baburam Bhattarai who called Singh a great scholar of the present time.

References

Academic staff of Delhi University
1922 births

2016 deaths